K17ED-D is a low-power Class A television station in Payette, Idaho, broadcasting locally in digital on UHF channel 17 as an affiliate of the Three Angels Broadcasting Network (3ABN). Founded July 21, 1995, the station is owned and operated by HC2 Holdings. The station was owned by 3ABN until 2017, when it was included in a $9.6 million sale of 14 stations to HC2 Holdings.

Subchannels

References

External links 

Religious television stations in the United States
Innovate Corp.
Television stations in Idaho
Television channels and stations established in 1995
Low-power television stations in the United States